= Jay Ganapathy =

Indian politician

Jay Ganapathy is a politician and incumbent Member of the Legislative Assembly of Tamil Nadu. He was elected to the Tamil Nadu Legislative Assembly as an Indian National Congress candidate in the 2001 and 2006 elections.
